Falun Gong or Falun Dafa is a new religious movement. Falun Gong was founded by its leader Li Hongzhi in China in the early 1990s. Falun Gong has its global headquarters in Dragon Springs, a  compound in Deerpark, New York, near the residence of Li Hongzhi.

Falun Gong administers a variety of outreach organizations in the United States and elsewhere, including the dance troupe Shen Yun.They are known for their views against the Chinese Communist Party and their anti-evolutionary stance. They also operate Epoch Media Group, which is known for its subsidiaries, New Tang Dynasty Television and The Epoch Times newspaper. The latter has been broadly noted as a politically far-right media entity, and it has received significant attention in the United States for promoting conspiracy theories, such as QAnon and anti-vaccine misinformation, and producing advertisements for former U.S. President Donald Trump. It has also drawn attention in Europe, promoting far-right politicians, primarily in France and Germany.  

Falun Gong emerged toward the end of China's "qigong boom"—a period that saw a proliferation of similar practices of meditation, slow-moving energy exercises and regulated breathing. Falun Gong combines meditation and qigong exercises with a moral philosophy. The practice emphasizes morality and the cultivation of virtue, and identifies as a practice of the Buddhist school, though its teachings also incorporate elements drawn from Taoist traditions. Through moral rectitude and the practice of meditation, practitioners of Falun Gong aspire to eliminate attachments, and ultimately to achieve spiritual enlightenment.

Although practice initially enjoyed support from Chinese Communist Party (CCP) officials, by the mid-to-late 1990s negative coverage of Falun Gong began to appear in state-run media. Practitioners usually responded by picketing the source involved, and controversy and tension continued to build. The scale of protests grew until April 1999, when over 10,000 Falun Gong practitioners gathered near the central government compound in Beijing to request legal recognition and freedom from state interference. This demonstration is widely seen as catalyzing the persecution that followed.

On 20 July 1999, the CCP leadership initiated a nationwide crackdown and multifaceted propaganda campaign directed against the practice. It blocked Internet access to websites that mention Falun Gong, and in October 1999 it declared Falun Gong a "heretical organization" that threatened social stability. Falun Gong practitioners in China are reportedly subject to a wide range of human rights abuses: hundreds of thousands are estimated to have been imprisoned extrajudicially, and practitioners in detention are subject to forced labor, psychiatric abuse, torture, and other coercive methods of thought reform at the hands of Chinese authorities. , human rights groups estimated that at least 2,000 Falun Gong practitioners had died within China as a result of abuse in custody. Data from within China suggests that millions continued to practice Falun Gong there in spite of the persecution. Outside of China, Falun Gong is practiced in over 70 countries, with estimates on the number of adherents  ranging from roughly 40,000 to several hundreds of thousands.

Beliefs and practices

Central teachings

Falun Gong aspires to enable the practitioner to ascend spiritually through moral rectitude and the practice of a set of exercises and meditation. The three stated tenets of the belief are truthfulness, compassion, and forbearance. These principles have been repeated by Falun Gong members to outsiders as a tactic for evading deeper inquiry, and followers have been instructed by Li to lie about the practice. Together these principles are regarded as the fundamental nature of the cosmos, the criteria for differentiating right from wrong, and are held to be the highest manifestations of the Tao. Adherence to and cultivation of these virtues is regarded as a fundamental part of Falun Gong practice. In Zhuan Falun, the foundational text published in 1995, Li Hongzhi writes "It doesn't matter how mankind's moral standard changes[...] The nature of the cosmos doesn't change, and it is the only standard for determining who's good and who's bad. So to be a cultivator you have to take the nature of the cosmos as your guide for improving yourself."

Practice of Falun Gong consists of two features: performance of the exercises, and the refinement of one's  (moral character, temperament). In Falun Gong's central text, Li states that  "includes virtue (which is a type of matter), it includes forbearance, it includes awakening to things, it includes giving up things—giving up all the desires and all the attachments that are found in an ordinary person—and you also have to endure hardship, to name just a few things." The elevation of one's moral character is achieved, on the one hand, by aligning one's life with truth, compassion, and tolerance; and on the other, by abandoning desires and "negative thoughts and behaviors, such as greed, profit, lust, desire, killing, fighting, theft, robbery, deception, jealousy, etc."

Among the central concepts found in the teachings of Falun Gong is the existence of 'Virtue' and 'Karma'. The former is generated through doing good deeds and suffering, while the latter is accumulated through doing wrong deeds. A person's ratio of karma to virtue is said to determine their fortunes in this life or the next. While virtue engenders good fortune and enables spiritual transformation, an accumulation of karma results in suffering, illness, and alienation from the nature of the universe. Spiritual elevation is achieved through the elimination of negative karma and the accumulation of virtue. Practitioners believe that through a process of moral cultivation, one can achieve Tao and obtain special powers and a level of divinity.

Falun Gong's teachings posit that human beings are originally and innately good—even divine—but that they descended into a realm of delusion and suffering after developing selfishness and accruing karma. The practice holds that reincarnation exists and that different people's reincarnation processes are overseen by different gods. To re-ascend and return to the "original, true self", Falun Gong practitioners are supposed to assimilate themselves to the qualities of truthfulness, compassion and tolerance, let go of "attachments and desires" and suffer to repay karma.

Traditional Chinese cultural thought and modernity are two focuses of Li Hongzhi's teachings. Falun Gong echoes traditional Chinese beliefs that humans are connected to the universe through mind and body, and Li seeks to challenge "conventional mentalities", concerning the nature and genesis of the universe, time-space, and the human body. The practice draws on East Asian mysticism and traditional Chinese medicine, criticizes the purportedly self-imposed limits of modern science, especially evolution, and views traditional Chinese science as an entirely different, yet equally valid ontological system.

Li says that he is a being who has come to help humankind from the destruction it could face as the result of rampant evil. When asked if he was a human being, Li replied "You can think of me as a human being."

Exercises

In addition to its moral philosophy, Falun Gong consists of four standing exercises and one sitting meditation. The exercises are regarded as secondary to moral elevation, though are still an essential component of Falun Gong cultivation practice.

The first exercises, called "Buddha Stretching a Thousand Arms", are intended to facilitate the free flow of energy through the body and open up the meridians. The second exercise, "Falun Standing Stance", involves holding four static poses—each of which resembles holding a wheel—for an extended period. The objective of this exercise is to "enhances wisdom, increases strength, raises a person's level, and strengthens divine powers". The third, "Penetrating the Cosmic Extremes", involves three sets of movements, which aim to enable the expulsion of bad energy (e.g., pathogenic or black ) and the absorption of good energy into the body. Through practice of this exercise, the practitioner aspires to cleanse and purify the body. The fourth exercise, "Falun Cosmic Orbit", seeks to circulate energy freely throughout the body. Unlike the first through fourth exercises, the fifth exercise is performed in the seated lotus position. Called "Reinforcing Supernatural Powers", it is a meditation intended to be maintained as long as possible.

Falun Gong exercises can be practiced individually or in group settings, and can be performed for varying lengths of time in accordance with the needs and abilities of the individual practitioner. Porter writes that practitioners of Falun Gong are encouraged to read Falun Gong books and practice its exercises on a regular basis, preferably daily. Falun Gong exercises are practiced in group settings in parks, university campuses, and other public spaces in over 70 countries worldwide, and are taught for free by volunteers. In addition to five exercises, in 2001 another meditation activity was introduced called "sending righteous thoughts", which is intended to reduce persecution on the spiritual plane.

Discussions of supernatural skills also feature prominently within the  movement, and the existence of these skills gained a level of mainstream acceptance in China's scientific community in the 1980s. Falun Gong's teachings hold that practitioners can acquire supernatural skills through a combination of moral cultivation, meditation and exercises. These include—but are not limited to—precognition, clairaudience, telepathy, and divine sight (via the opening of the third eye or celestial eye). However, Falun Gong stresses that these powers can be developed only as a result of moral practice, and should not be pursued or casually displayed. According to David Ownby, Falun Gong teaches that "pride in one's abilities, or the desire to show off, are marks of dangerous attachments", and Li warns his followers not to be distracted by the pursuit of such powers.

Social practices

Falun Gong differentiates itself from Buddhist monastic traditions in that it places great importance on participation in the secular world. Falun Gong practitioners are required to maintain regular jobs and family lives, to observe the laws of their respective governments, and are instructed not to distance themselves from society. An exception is made for Buddhist Bhikkhus and Bhikkhunīs, who are permitted to continue a monastic lifestyle while practicing Falun Gong.

As part of its emphasis on ethical behavior, Falun Gong's teachings prescribe a strict personal morality for practitioners. They are expected to do good deeds, and conduct themselves with patience and forbearance when encountering difficulties. For instance, Li stipulates that a practitioner of Falun Gong must "not hit back when attacked, not talk back when insulted." In addition, they must "abandon negative thoughts and behaviors", such as greed, deception, jealousy, etc. The teachings contain injunctions against smoking and the consumption of alcohol, as these are considered addictions that are detrimental to health and mental clarity. Practitioners of Falun Gong are forbidden to kill living things—including animals for the purpose of obtaining food—though they are not required to adopt a vegetarian diet.

In addition to these things, practitioners of Falun Gong must abandon a variety of worldly attachments and desires. In the course of cultivation practice, the student of Falun Gong aims to relinquish the pursuit of fame, monetary gain, sentimentality, and other entanglements. Li's teachings repeatedly emphasize the emptiness of material pursuits; although practitioners of Falun Gong are not encouraged to leave their jobs or eschew money, they are expected to give up the psychological attachments to these things. Similarly, sexual desire and lust are treated as attachments to be discarded, but Falun Gong students are still generally expected to marry and have families. All sexual relations outside the confines of monogamous, heterosexual marriage are regarded as immoral.

Li Hongzhi taught that homosexuality makes one "unworthy of being human", creates bad karma, and is comparable to organized crime. He also taught that "disgusting homosexuality shows the dirty abnormal psychology of the gay who has lost his ability of reasoning". Li additionally stated in a 1998 speech in Switzerland that the gods' "first target of annihilation would be homosexuals". Although gay, lesbian, and bisexual people may practice Falun Gong, founder Li stated that they must "give up the bad conduct" of all same-sex sexual activity.

Falun Gong's cosmology includes the belief that different ethnicities each have a correspondence to their own heavens, and that individuals of mixed race lose some aspect of this connection.

Falun Gong doctrine counsels against participation in political or social issues. Excessive interest in politics is viewed as an attachment to worldly power and influence, and Falun Gong aims for transcendence of such pursuits. According to Hu Ping, "Falun Gong deals only with purifying the individual through exercise, and does not touch on social or national concerns. It has not suggested or even intimated a model for social change. Many religions[...] pursue social reform to some extent[...] but there is no such tendency evident in Falun Gong."

Texts
Li Hongzhi authored the first book of Falun Gong teachings in April 1993; titled China Falun Gong, or simply Falun Gong, it is an introductory text that discusses , Falun Gong's relationship to Buddhism, the principles of cultivation practice, and the improvement of moral character. The book also provides illustrations and explanations of the exercises and meditation.

The main body of teachings is articulated in the book Zhuan Falun, published in Chinese in January 1995. The book is divided into nine "lectures", and was based on edited transcriptions of the talks Li gave throughout China in the preceding three years. Falun Gong texts have since been translated into an additional 40 languages. In addition to these central texts, Li has published several books, lectures, articles and books of poetry, which are made available on Falun Gong websites.

The Falun Gong teachings use numerous untranslated Chinese religious and philosophical terms, and make frequent allusion to characters and incidents in Chinese folk literature and concepts drawn from Chinese popular religion. This, coupled with the literal translation style of the texts, which imitate the colloquial style of Li's speeches, can make Falun Gong scriptures difficult to approach for Westerners.

Symbols
In Buddhism, the  represents the completeness of the doctrine. To "turn the wheel of dharma" means to preach the Buddhist doctrine, and is the title of Falun Gong's main text. Despite the invocation of Buddhist language and symbols, the law wheel as understood in Falun Gong has distinct connotations, and is held to represent the universe. It is conceptualized by an emblem consisting of one large and four small (counter-clockwise) swastika symbols, representing the Buddha, and four small Taiji (yin-yang) symbols of the Daoist tradition.

Dharma-ending period
Li situates his teaching of Falun Gong amidst the "Dharma-ending period", described in Buddhist scriptures as an age of moral decline when the teachings of Buddhism would need to be rectified. The current era is described in Falun Gong's teachings as the " rectification" period (which might also be translated as "to correct the dharma"), a time of cosmic transition and renewal. The process of  rectification is necessitated by the moral decline and degeneration of life in the universe, and in the post-1999 context, the persecution of Falun Gong by the Chinese government has come to be viewed as a tangible symptom of this moral decay. Through the process of the  rectification, life will be reordered according to the moral and spiritual quality of each, with good people being saved and ascending to higher spiritual planes, and bad ones being eliminated or cast down. In this paradigm, Li assumes the role of rectifying the Dharma by disseminating through his moral teachings.

Some scholars, such as Maria Hsia Chang and Susan Palmer, have described Li's rhetoric about the " rectification" and providing salvation "in the final period of the Last Havoc" as apocalyptic. However, Benjamin Penny, a professor of Chinese history at the Australian National University, argues that Li's teachings are better understood in the context of a "Buddhist notion of the cycle of the Dharma or the Buddhist law". Richard Gunde wrote that, unlike apocalyptic groups in the West, Falun Gong does not fixate on death or the end of the world, and instead "has a simple, innocuous ethical message". Li Hongzhi does not discuss a "time of reckoning", and has rejected predictions of an impending apocalypse in his teachings.

Categorization
Scholars overwhelmingly describe Falun Gong as a new religious movement. The organization is regularly featured in handbooks of new religious movements. While commonly described by scholars as a new religious movement, adherents may reject this term.

Falun Gong is a multifaceted discipline that means different things to different people, ranging from a set of physical exercises for the attainment of better health and a praxis of self-transformation, to a moral philosophy and a new knowledge system.

In the cultural context of China, Falun Gong is generally described either as a system of qigong, or a type of "cultivation practice" (xiulian), a process by which an individual seeks spiritual perfection, often through both physical and moral conditioning. Varieties of cultivation practice are found throughout Chinese history, spanning Buddhist, Daoist, and Confucian traditions. Benjamin Penny writes "the best way to describe Falun Gong is as a cultivation system. Cultivation systems have been a feature of Chinese life for at least 2,500 years." Qigong practices can also be understood as a part of a broader tradition of "cultivation practice".

In the West, Falun Gong is frequently classified as a religion on the basis of its theological and moral teachings, its concerns with spiritual cultivation and transformation, and its extensive body of scripture. Falun Gong practitioners themselves have sometimes disavowed this classification, however. This rejection reflects the relatively narrow definition of "religion" (zongjiao) in contemporary China. According to David Ownby, religion in China has been defined since 1912 to refer to "world-historical faiths" that have "well-developed institutions, clergy, and textual traditions"—namely, Buddhism, Daoism, Islam, Protestantism, and Catholicism. Moreover, if Falun Gong had described itself as a religion in China, it likely would have invited immediate suppression. These historical and cultural circumstances notwithstanding, the practice has often been described as a form of Chinese religion.

Organization

As a matter of doctrinal significance, Falun Gong is intended to be "formless", having little to no material or formal organization. Practitioners of Falun Gong cannot collect money or charge fees, conduct healings, or teach or interpret doctrine for others. There are no administrators or officials within the practice, no system of membership, and no churches or physical places of worship. In the absence of membership or initiation rituals, Falun Gong practitioners can be anyone who chooses to identify themselves as such. Students are free to participate in the practice and follow its teachings as much or as little as they like, and practitioners do not instruct others on what to believe or how to behave.

Spiritual authority is vested exclusively in the teachings of founder Li Hongzhi. But organizationally Falun Gong is decentralized, and local branches and assistants are afforded no special privileges, authority, or titles. Volunteer "assistants" or "contact persons" do not hold authority over other practitioners, regardless of how long they have practiced Falun Gong. Li's spiritual authority within the practice is absolute, yet the organization of Falun Gong works against totalistic control, and Li does not intervene in the personal lives of practitioners. Falun Gong practitioners have little to no contact with Li, except through the study of his teachings. There is no hierarchy in Falun Gong to enforce orthodoxy, and little or no emphasis is given on dogmatic discipline; the only thing emphasized is the need for strict moral behavior, according to Craig Burgdoff, a professor of religious studies.

To the extent that organization is achieved in Falun Gong, it is accomplished through a global, networked, and largely virtual online community. In particular, electronic communications, email lists and a collection of websites are the primary means of coordinating activities and disseminating Li Hongzhi's teachings.

Outside Mainland China, a network of volunteer 'contact persons', regional Falun Dafa Associations and university clubs exist in approximately 80 countries. Li Hongzhi's teachings are principally spread through the Internet. In most mid- to large-sized cities, Falun Gong practitioners organize regular group meditation or study sessions in which they practice Falun Gong exercises and read Li Hongzhi's writings. The exercise and meditation sessions are described as informal groups of practitioners who gather in public parks—usually in the morning—for one to two hours. Group study sessions typically take place in the evenings in private residences or university or high school classrooms, and are described by David Ownby as "the closest thing to a regular 'congregational experience'" that Falun Gong offers. Individuals who are too busy, isolated, or who simply prefer solitude may elect to practice privately. When there are expenses to be covered (such as for the rental of facilities for large-scale conferences), costs are borne by self-nominated and relatively affluent individual members of the community.

Within China

In 1993, the Beijing-based Falun Dafa Research Society was accepted as a branch of the state-run China Qigong Research Society (CQRS), which oversaw the administration of the country's various qigong schools, and sponsored activities and seminars. As per the requirements of the CQRS, Falun Gong was organized into a nationwide network of assistance centers, "main stations", "branches", "guidance stations", and local practice sites, mirroring the structure of the qigong society or even of the Communist Party itself. Falun Gong assistants were self-selecting volunteers who taught the exercises, organized events, and disseminated new writings from Li Hongzhi. The Falun Dafa Research Society provided advice to students on meditation techniques, translation services, and coordination for the practice nationwide.

Following its departure from the CQRS in 1996, Falun Gong came under increased scrutiny from authorities and responded by adopting a more decentralized and loose organizational structure. In 1997, the Falun Dafa Research Society was formally dissolved, along with the regional "main stations". Yet practitioners continued to organize themselves at local levels, being connected through electronic communications, interpersonal networks and group exercise sites. Both Falun Gong sources and Chinese government sources claimed that there were some 1,900 "guidance stations" and 28,263 local Falun Gong exercise sites nationwide by 1999, though they disagree over the extent of vertical coordination among these organizational units. In response to the persecution that began in 1999, Falun Gong was driven underground, the organizational structure grew yet more informal within China, and the internet took precedence as a means of connecting practitioners.

Following the persecution of Falun Gong in 1999, Chinese authorities sought to portray Falun Gong as a hierarchical and well-funded organization. James Tong writes that it was in the government's interest to portray Falun Gong as highly organized in order to justify its repression of the group: "The more organized the Falun Gong could be shown to be, then the more justified the regime's repression in the name of social order was." He concluded that Party's claims lacked "both internal and external substantiating evidence", and that despite the arrests and scrutiny, the authorities never "credibly countered Falun Gong rebuttals".

Dragon Springs compound
Falun Gong operates out of Dragon Springs, a 400-acre compound located in Deerpark, New York. Falun Gong founder and leader Li Hongzhi resides near the compound, along with "hundreds" of Falun Gong adherents. Members of Falun Gong extension Shen Yun live and rehearse in the compound, which also contains schools and temples. The compound is registered as a church, Dragon Springs Buddhist, which gives it tax exemptions and greater privacy. Scholar Andrew Junker noted that in 2019, near Dragon Springs, in Middletown, was an office for the Falun Gong media extension The Epoch Times, which published a special local edition.

The compound has been a point of controversy among former residents. According to NBC News:
[F]our former compound residents and former Falun Gong practitioners who spoke to NBC News... said that life in Dragon Springs is tightly controlled by Li, that internet access is restricted, the use of medicines is discouraged, and arranged relationships are common. Two former residents on visas said they were offered to be set up with U.S. residents at the compound.

Tiger Huang, a former Dragon Springs resident who was on a United States student visa from Taiwan, said she was set up on three dates on the compound, and she believed her ability to stay in the United States was tied to the arrangement.

"The purpose of setting up the dates was obvious", Huang said. Her now-husband, a former Dragon Springs resident, confirmed the account. Huang said she was told by Dragon Springs officials her visa had expired and was told to go back to Taiwan after months of dating a nonpractitioner in the compound. She later learned that her visa had not expired when she was told to leave the country.

Acquired by Falun Gong in 2000, the site is closed to visitors and features guarded gates, has been a point of contention for some Deer Park residents concerned. In 2019, Falun Gong requested to expand the site, wishing to add a 920-seat concert hall, a new parking garage, a wastewater treatment plant and a conversion of meditation space into residential space large enough to bring the total residential capacity to 500 people. These plans met with opposition from the Delaware Riverkeeper Network regarding the wastewater treatment facility and the elimination of local wetlands, impacting local waterways such as the Basher Kill and Neversink River. Local residents opposed the expansion because it would increase traffic and reduce the rural character of the area. Falun Gong adherents living in the area have claimed that they have experienced discrimination from local residents.

After visiting in 2019, Junker noted that "the secrecy of Dragon Springs was obvious and a source of tension for the town." Junker adds that, Dragon Springs's website says its restricted access is for security reasons, and that the site claims the compound contains orphans and refugees .

Demography
Prior to July 1999, official estimates placed the number of Falun Gong practitioners at 70 million nationwide, rivaling membership in the Communist Party. By the time of the persecution on 22 July 1999, most Chinese government numbers said the population of Falun Gong was between 2 and 3 million, though some publications maintained an estimate of 40 million. Most Falun Gong estimates in the same period placed the total number of practitioners in China at 70 to 80 million. Other sources have estimated the Falun Gong population in China to have peaked between 10 and 70 million practitioners. The number of Falun Gong practitioners still practicing in China today is difficult to confirm, though some sources estimate that tens of millions continue to practice privately.

Demographic surveys conducted in China in 1998 found a population that was mostly female and elderly. Of 34,351 Falun Gong practitioners surveyed, 27% were male and 73% female. Only 38% were under 50 years old. Falun Gong attracted a range of other individuals, from young college students to bureaucrats, intellectuals and Party officials. Surveys in China from the 1990s found that between 23 and 40% of practitioners held university degrees at the college or graduate level—several times higher than the general population.

Falun Gong is practiced by tens, and possibly hundreds, of thousands outside China, with the largest communities found in Taiwan and North American cities with large Chinese populations, such as New York and Toronto. Demographic surveys by Palmer and Ownby in these communities found that 90% of practitioners are ethnic Chinese. The average age was approximately 40. Among survey respondents, 56% were female and 44% male; 80% were married. The surveys found the respondents to be highly educated: 9% held PhDs, 34% had master's degrees, and 24% had a bachelor's degree.

As of 2008, the most commonly reported reasons for being attracted to Falun Gong were intellectual content, cultivation exercises, and health benefits. Non-Chinese Falun Gong practitioners tend to fit the profile of "spiritual seekers"—people who had tried a variety of qigong, yoga, or religious practices before finding Falun Gong. According to sociologist Richard Madsen, who specializes in studying modern Chinese culture, Chinese scientists with doctorates from prestigious American universities who practice Falun Gong claim that modern physics (for example, superstring theory) and biology (specifically the pineal gland's function) provide a scientific basis for their beliefs. From their point of view, "Falun Dafa is knowledge rather than religion, a new form of science rather than faith".

History inside China

1992–1996
Li Hongzhi introduced Falun Gong to the public on 13 May 1992, in Changchun, Jilin Province. Several months later, in September 1992, Falun Gong was admitted as a branch of qigong under the administration of the state-run China Qigong Scientific Research Society (CQRS). Li was recognized as a qigong master, and was authorized to teach his practice nationwide. Like many qigong masters at the time, Li toured major cities in China from 1992 to 1994 to teach the practice. He was granted a number of awards by PRC governmental organizations.

According to David Ownby, Professor of History and Director of the Center for East Asian Studies at the Université de Montréal, Li became an "instant star of the qigong movement", and Falun Gong was embraced by the government as an effective means of lowering health care costs, promoting Chinese culture, and improving public morality. In December 1992, for instance, Li and several Falun Gong students participated in the Asian Health Expo in Beijing, where he reportedly "received the most praise [of any qigong school] at the fair, and achieved very good therapeutic results", according to the fair's organizer. The event helped cement Li's popularity, and journalistic reports of Falun Gong's healing powers spread. In 1993, a publication of the Ministry of Public Security praised Li for "promoting the traditional crime-fighting virtues of the Chinese people, in safeguarding social order and security, and in promoting rectitude in society."

Falun Gong had differentiated itself from other qigong groups in its emphasis on morality, low cost, and health benefits. It rapidly spread via word-of-mouth, attracting a wide range of practitioners from all walks of life, including numerous members of the Chinese Communist Party.

From 1992 to 1994, Li did charge fees for the seminars he was giving across China, though the fees were considerably lower than those of competing qigong practices, and the local qigong associations received a substantial share. Li justified the fees as being necessary to cover travel costs and other expenses, and on some occasions, he donated the money earned to charitable causes. In 1994, Li ceased charging fees altogether, thereafter stipulating that Falun Gong must always be taught for free, and its teachings made available without charge (including online). Although some observers believe Li continued to earn substantial income through the sale of Falun Gong books, others dispute this, asserting that most Falun Gong books in circulation were bootleg copies.

With the publication of the books Falun Gong and Zhuan Falun, Li made his teachings more widely accessible. Zhuan Falun, published in January 1995 at an unveiling ceremony held in the auditorium of the Ministry of Public Security, became a best-seller in China.

In 1995, Chinese authorities began looking to Falun Gong to solidify its organizational structure and ties to the party-state. Li was approached by the Chinese National Sports Committee, Ministry of Public Health, and China Qigong Science Research Association (CQRS) to jointly establish a Falun Gong association. Li declined the offer. The same year, the CQRS issued a new regulation mandating that all qigong denominations establish a Communist Party branch. Li again refused.

Tensions continued to mount between Li and the CQRS in 1996. In the face of Falun Gong's rise in popularity—a large part of which was attributed to its low cost—competing qigong masters accused Li of undercutting them. According to Schechter, the qigong society under which Li and other qigong masters belonged asked Li to hike his tuition, but Li emphasized the need for the teachings to be free of charge.

In March 1996, Falun Gong withdrew from the CQRS in response to mounting disagreements, after which time it operated outside the official sanction of the state. Falun Gong representatives attempted to register with other government entities, but were rebuffed. Li and Falun Gong were then outside the circuit of personal relations and financial exchanges through which masters and their qigong organizations could find a place within the state system, and also the protections this afforded.

1996–1999
Falun Gong's departure from the state-run CQRS corresponded to a wider shift in the government's attitudes towards qigong practices. As qigong's detractors in government grew more influential, authorities began attempting to rein in the growth and influence of these groups, some of which had amassed tens of millions of followers. In the mid-1990s the state-run media began publishing articles critical of qigong.

Falun Gong was initially shielded from the mounting criticism, but following its withdrawal from the CQRS in March 1996, it lost this protection. On 17 June 1996, the Guangming Daily, an influential state-run newspaper, published a polemic against Falun Gong in which its central text, Zhuan Falun, was described as an example of "feudal superstition". The author wrote that the history of humanity is a "struggle between science and superstition", and called on Chinese publishers not to print "pseudo-scientific books of the swindlers". The article was followed by at least twenty more in newspapers nationwide. Soon after, on 24 July, the Central Propaganda Department banned all publication of Falun Gong books (though the ban was not consistently enforced). The state-administered Buddhist Association of China also began issuing criticisms of Falun Gong, urging lay Buddhists not to take up the practice.

The events were an important challenge to Falun Gong, and one that practitioners did not take lightly. Thousands of Falun Gong followers wrote to Guangming Daily and to the CQRS to complain against the measures, claiming that they violated Hu Yaobang's 1982 'Triple No' directive, which prohibited the media from either encouraging or criticizing qigong practices. In other instances, Falun Gong practitioners staged peaceful demonstrations outside media or local government offices to request retractions of perceived unfair coverage.

The polemics against Falun Gong were part of a larger movement opposing qigong organizations in the state-run media. Although Falun Gong was not the only target of the media criticism, nor the only group to protest, theirs was the most mobilized and steadfast response. Many of Falun Gong's protests against negative media portrayals were successful, resulting in the retraction of several newspaper stories critical of the practice. This contributed to practitioners' belief that the media claims against them were false or exaggerated, and that their stance was justified.

In June 1998, He Zuoxiu, an outspoken critic of qigong and a fierce defender of Marxism, appeared on a talk show on Beijing Television and openly disparaged qigong groups, making particular mention of Falun Gong. Falun Gong practitioners responded with peaceful protests and by lobbying the station for a retraction. The reporter responsible for the program was reportedly fired, and a program favorable to Falun Gong was aired several days later. Falun Gong practitioners also mounted demonstrations at 14 other media outlets.

In 1997, The Ministry of Public Security launched an investigation into whether Falun Gong should be deemed xie jiao ("heretical teaching"). The report concluded that "no evidence has appeared thus far". The following year, however, on 21 July 1998, the Ministry of Public Security issued Document No. 555, "Notice of the Investigation of Falun Gong". The document asserted that Falun Gong is a "heretical teaching", and mandated that another investigation be launched to seek evidence in support of the conclusion. Falun Gong practitioners reported having phone lines tapped, homes ransacked and raided, and Falun Gong exercise sites disrupted by public security agents.

In this time period, even as criticism of qigong and Falun Gong mounted in some circles, the practice maintained a number of high-profile supporters in the government. In 1998, Qiao Shi, the recently retired Chairman of the Standing Committee of the National People's Congress, initiated his own investigation into Falun Gong. After months of investigations, his group concluded that "Falun Gong has hundreds of benefits for the Chinese people and China, and does not have one single bad effect." In May of the same year, China's National Sports Commission launched its own survey of Falun Gong. Based on interviews with over 12,000 Falun Gong practitioners in Guangdong province, they stated that they were "convinced the exercises and effects of Falun Gong are excellent. It has done an extraordinary amount to improve society's stability and ethics."

The practice's founder, Li Hongzhi, was largely absent from the country during the period of rising tensions with the government. In March 1995, Li had left China to first teach his practice in France and then other countries, and in 1998 obtained permanent residency in the United States.

By 1999, estimates provided by the State Sports Commission suggested there were 70 million Falun Gong practitioners in China. An anonymous employee of China's National Sports Commission, was at this time quoted in an interview with U.S. News & World Report as speculating that if 100 million had taken up Falun Gong and other forms of qigong there would be a dramatic reduction of health care costs and that "Premier Zhu Rongji is very happy about that."

Tianjin and Zhongnanhai protests
By the late 1990s, the Communist Party's relationship to the growing Falun Gong movement had become increasingly tense. Reports of discrimination and surveillance by the Public Security Bureau were escalating, and Falun Gong practitioners were routinely organizing sit-in demonstrations responding to media articles they deemed to be unfair. The conflicting investigations launched by the Ministry of the Public Security on one side and the State Sports Commission and Qiao Shi on the other spoke of the disagreements among China's elites on how to regard the growing practice.

In April 1999, an article critical of Falun Gong was published in Tianjin Normal University's Youth Reader magazine. The article was authored by physicist He Zuoxiu who, as Porter and Gutmann indicate, is a relative of Politburo member and public security secretary Luo Gan. The article cast qigong, and Falun Gong in particular, as superstitious and harmful for youth. Falun Gong practitioners responded by picketing the offices of the newspaper requesting a retraction of the article. Unlike past instances in which Falun Gong protests were successful, on 22 April the Tianjin demonstration was broken up by the arrival of three hundred riot police. Some of the practitioners were beaten, and forty-five arrested. Other Falun Gong practitioners were told that if they wished to appeal further, they needed to take the issue up with the Ministry of Public Security and go to Beijing to appeal.

The Falun Gong community quickly mobilized a response, and on the morning of 25 April, upwards of 10,000 practitioners gathered near the central appeals office to demand an end to the escalating harassment against the movement, and request the release of the Tianjin practitioners. According to Benjamin Penny, practitioners sought redress from the leadership of the country by going to them and, "albeit very quietly and politely, making it clear that they would not be treated so shabbily." They sat or read quietly on the sidewalks surrounding the Zhongnanhai.

Five Falun Gong representatives met with Premier Zhu Rongji and other senior officials to negotiate a resolution. The Falun Gong representatives were assured that the regime supported physical exercises for health improvements and did not consider the Falun Gong to be anti-government.

Party general secretary Jiang Zemin was alerted to the demonstration by CPC Politburo member Luo Gan, and was reportedly angered by the audacity of the demonstration—the largest since the 1989 Tiananmen Square protests and massacre. Jiang called for resolute action to suppress the group, and reportedly criticized Premier Zhu for being "too soft" in his handling of the situation. That evening, Jiang composed a letter indicating his desire to see Falun Gong "defeated". In the letter, Jiang expressed concerns over the size and popularity of Falun Gong, and in particular about the large number of senior Communist Party members found among Falun Gong practitioners. He believed it possible foreign forces were behind Falun Gong's protests (the practice's founder, Li Hongzhi, had emigrated to the United States), and expressed concern about their use of the internet to coordinate a large-scale demonstration. Jiang also intimated that Falun Gong's moral philosophy was at odds with the atheist values of Marxist–Leninism, and therefore constituted a form of ideological competition.

Jiang is held by Falun Gong to be personally responsible for this decision to persecute Falun Gong. Peerman cited reasons such as suspected personal jealousy of Li Hongzhi; Saich points to Jiang's anger at Falun Gong's widespread appeal, and ideological struggle as causes for the crackdown that followed. Willy Wo-Lap Lam suggests Jiang's decision to suppress Falun Gong was related to a desire to consolidate his power within the Politburo. According to Human Rights Watch, Communist Party leaders and ruling elite were far from unified in their support for the crackdown.

Persecution

On 20 July 1999, security forces abducted and detained thousands of Falun Gong practitioners who they identified as leaders. Two days later, on 22 July, the PRC Ministry of Civil Affairs outlawed the Falun Dafa Research Society as an illegal organization that was "engaged in illegal activities, advocating superstition and spreading fallacies, hoodwinking people, inciting and creating disturbances, and jeopardizing social stability". The same day, the Ministry of Public Security issued a circular forbidding citizens from practicing Falun Gong in groups, possessing Falun Gong's teachings, displaying Falun Gong banners or symbols, or protesting against the ban.

The aim of the ensuing campaign was to "eradicate" the group through a combination of means which included the publication and distribution of propaganda which denounced it and the imprisonment and coercive thought reform of its practitioners, sometimes resulting in deaths. In October 1999, four months after the imposition of the ban, legislation was passed in order to outlaw "heterodox religions" and sentence Falun Gong devotees to prison terms.

Hundreds of thousands of Falun Gong practitioners are estimated to have been extrajudicially imprisoned, and practitioners who are currently in detention are reportedly subjected to forced labor, psychiatric abuse, torture, and other coercive methods of thought reform at the hands of Chinese authorities. The U.S. Department of State and Congressional-Executive Commission on China cite estimates that as much as half of China's reeducation-through-labor camp population is made up of Falun Gong practitioners. Researcher Ethan Gutmann estimates that Falun Gong practitioners represent an average of 15 to 20 percent of the total "laogai" population, a population which includes practitioners who are currently being held in re-education through labor camps as well as practitioners who are currently being held in prisons and other forms of administrative detention. Former detainees of the labor camp system have reported that Falun Gong practitioners comprise one of the largest groups of prisoners; in some labor camp and prison facilities, they comprise the majority of the detainees, and they are often said to receive the longest sentences and the worst treatment. A 2013 report on labor reeducation camps by Amnesty International found that in some cases, Falun Gong practitioners "constituted on average from one third to 100 per cent of the total population" of certain camps.

According to Johnson, the campaign against Falun Gong extends to many aspects of society, including the media apparatus, the police force, the military, the education system, and workplaces. An extra-constitutional body, the "610 Office" was created to "oversee" the effort. Human Rights Watch (2002) commented that families and workplace employees were urged to cooperate with the government.

Causes
Observers have attempted to explain the Party's rationale for banning Falun Gong as stemming from a variety of factors. Many of these explanations centre on institutional causes, such as Falun Gong's size and popularity, its independence from the state, and internal politics within the Chinese Communist Party. Other scholars have noted that Chinese authorities were troubled by Falun Gong's moral and spiritual content, which put it at odds with aspects of the official Marxist ideology. Still others have pointed to China's history of bloody sectarian revolts as a possible factor leading to the crackdown.

Xinhua News Agency, the official news organization of the Communist Party, declared that Falun Gong is "opposed to the Communist Party of China and the central government, preaches idealism, theism and feudal superstition." Xinhua also asserted that "the so-called 'truth, kindness and forbearance' principle preached by [Falun Gong] has nothing in common with the socialist ethical and cultural progress we are striving to achieve", and it also argued that it was necessary to crush Falun Gong in order to preserve the "vanguard role and purity" of the Communist Party. Other articles which appeared in the state-run media in the first days and weeks after the ban was imposed posited that Falun Gong must be defeated because its "theistic" philosophy was at odds with the Marxism–Leninism paradigm and the secular values of materialism.

Willy Wo-Lap Lam writes that Jiang Zemin's campaign against Falun Gong may have been used to promote allegiance to himself; Lam quotes one party veteran as saying "by unleashing a Mao-style movement [against Falun Gong], Jiang is forcing senior cadres to pledge allegiance to his line." The Washington Post reported that sources indicated not all of the standing committee of the Politburo shared Jiang's view that Falun Gong should be eradicated,

Human Rights Watch commented that the crackdown on Falun Gong reflects historical efforts by the Chinese Communist Party to eradicate religion, which the government believes is inherently subversive. The Chinese government protects five "patriotic", Communist Party-sanctioned religious groups. Unregistered religions that fall outside the state-sanctioned organizations are thus vulnerable to suppression. The Globe and Mail wrote: "any group that does not come under the control of the Party is a threat". Craig S. Smith of The Wall Street Journal wrote that the party feels increasingly threatened by any belief system that challenges its ideology and has an ability to organize itself. That Falun Gong, whose belief system represented a revival of traditional Chinese religion, was being practiced by a large number of Communist Party members and members of the military was seen as particularly disturbing to Jiang Zemin; according to Julia Ching, "Jiang accepts the threat of Falun Gong as an ideological one: spiritual beliefs against militant atheism and historical materialism. He [wished] to purge the government and the military of such beliefs."

Yuezhi Zhao points to several other factors that may have led to a deterioration of the relationship between Falun Gong and the Chinese state and media. These included infighting within China's qigong establishment, the influence of qigong opponents among Communist Party leaders, and the struggles from mid-1996 to mid-1999 between Falun Gong and the Chinese power elite over the status and treatment of the movement. According to Zhao, Falun Gong practitioners have established a "resistance identity"—one that stands against prevailing pursuits of wealth, power, scientific rationality, and "the entire value system associated with China's project of modernization." In China the practice represented an indigenous spiritual and moral tradition, a cultural revitalization movement, and it was a sharp contrast to "Marxism with Chinese characteristics".

Vivienne Shue similarly writes that Falun Gong presented a comprehensive challenge to the Communist Party's legitimacy. Shue argues that Chinese rulers have historically derived their legitimacy from their claim to possess an exclusive connection to the "Truth". In imperial China, truth was based on a Confucian and Daoist cosmology, where in the case of the Communist Party, the truth is represented by Marxist–Leninism and historical materialism. Falun Gong challenged the Marxist–Leninism paradigm, reviving an understanding which is based on more traditionally Buddhist or Daoist conceptions. David Ownby contends that Falun Gong also challenged the Communist Party's hegemony over the Chinese nationalist discourse: "[Falun Gong's] evocation of a different vision of Chinese tradition and its contemporary values are now so threatening to the state and the party because it denies them the sole right to define the meaning of Chinese nationalism, and it even denies them the sole right to define the meaning of Chineseness."

Maria Chang commented that since the overthrow of the Qin dynasty, "Millenarian movements had exerted a profound impact on the course of Chinese history", culminating in the Chinese Revolutions of 1949, which brought the Chinese Communists to power. Patsy Rahn (2002) describes a paradigm of conflict between Chinese sectarian groups and the rulers who they often challenge. According to Rahn, the history of this paradigm goes back to the collapse of the Han dynasty: "The pattern of a ruling power keeping a watchful eye on sectarian groups, at times threatened by them, at times raising campaigns against them, began as early as the second century and continued throughout the dynastic period, through the Mao era and into the present."

Conversion program

According to James Tong, the regime aimed at both coercive dissolution of the Falun Gong denomination and "transformation" of the practitioners. By 2000, the Party escalated its campaign by sentencing "recidivist" practitioners to "re-education through labor" in an effort to have them renounce their beliefs and "transform" their thoughts. Terms were also arbitrarily extended by police, while some practitioners had ambiguous charges levied against them, such as "disrupting social order", "endangering national security", or "subverting the socialist system". According to Bejesky, the majority of long-term Falun Gong detainees are processed administratively through this system instead of the criminal justice system. Upon completion of their re-education sentences, those practitioners who refused to recant were then incarcerated in "legal education centers" set up by provincial authorities to "transform minds".

Much of the conversion program relied on Mao-style techniques of indoctrination and thought reform, where Falun Gong practitioners were organized to view anti-Falun Gong television programs and enroll in Marxism and materialism study sessions. Traditional Marxism and materialism were the core content of the sessions.

The government-sponsored image of the conversion process emphasizes psychological persuasion and a variety of "soft-sell" techniques; this is the "ideal norm" in regime reports, according to Tong. Falun Gong reports, on the other hand, depict "disturbing and sinister" forms of coercion against practitioners who fail to renounce their beliefs. Among them are cases of severe beatings; psychological torment, corporal punishment and forced intense, heavy-burden hard labor and stress positions; solitary confinement in squalid conditions; "heat treatment" including burning and freezing; electric shocks delivered to sensitive parts of the body that may result in nausea, convulsions, or fainting; "devastative" forced feeding; sticking bamboo strips into fingernails; deprivation of food, sleep, and use of toilet; rape and gang rape; asphyxiation; and threat, extortion, and termination of employment and student status.

The cases appear verifiable, and the great majority identify (1) the individual practitioner, often with age, occupation, and residence; (2) the time and location that the alleged abuse took place, down to the level of the district, township, village, and often the specific jail institution; and (3) the names and ranks of the alleged perpetrators. Many such reports include lists of the names of witnesses and descriptions of injuries, Tong says. The publication of "persistent abusive, often brutal behavior by named individuals with their official title, place, and time of torture" suggests that there is no official will to cease and desist such activities.

Deaths
Due to the difficulty in corroborating reports of torture deaths in China, estimates of the number of Falun Gong practitioners who have been killed as a result of the persecution vary widely. In 2009, The New York Times reported that, according to human rights groups, the repressions had claimed "at least 2,000" lives. Amnesty International said at least 100 Falun Gong practitioners had reportedly died in the 2008 calendar year, either in custody or shortly after their release. Investigative journalist Ethan Gutmann estimated 65,000 Falun Gong were killed for their organs from 2000 to 2008 based on extensive interviews, while researchers David Kilgour and David Matas reported, "the source of 41,500 transplants for the six-year period 2000 to 2005 is unexplained".

Chinese authorities do not publish statistics on Falun Gong practitioners killed amidst the crackdown. In individual cases, however, authorities have denied that deaths in custody were due to torture.

Organ harvesting

In 2006, allegations emerged that a large number of Falun Gong practitioners had been killed to supply China's organ transplant industry. These allegations prompted an investigation by former Canadian Secretary of State David Kilgour and human rights lawyer David Matas.

The Kilgour-Matas report was published in July 2006, and concluded that "the government of China and its agencies in numerous parts of the country, in particular hospitals but also detention centers and 'people's courts', since 1999 have put to death a large but unknown number of Falun Gong prisoners of conscience." The report, which was based mainly on circumstantial evidence, called attention to the extremely short wait times for organs in China—one to two weeks for a liver compared with 32.5 months in Canada—implying it was indicative of organs being procured on demand. It also tracked a significant increase in the number of annual organ transplants in China beginning in 1999, corresponding with the onset of the persecution of Falun Gong. Despite very low levels of voluntary organ donation, China performs the second-highest number of transplants per year. Kilgour and Matas also presented self-accusatory material from Chinese transplant center web sites advertising the immediate availability of organs from living donors, and transcripts of interviews in which hospitals told prospective transplant recipients that they could obtain Falun Gong organs.

In May 2008 two United Nations Special Rapporteurs reiterated requests for the Chinese authorities to respond to the allegations, and to explain a source for the organs that would account for the sudden increase in organ transplants in China since 2000. Chinese officials have responded by denying the organ harvesting allegations, and insisting that China abides by World Health Organization principles that prohibit the sale of human organs without written consent from donors. Responding to a U.S. House of Representatives Resolution calling for an end to abusing transplant practices against religious and ethnic minorities, a Chinese embassy spokesperson said "the so-called organ harvesting from death-row prisoners is totally a lie fabricated by Falun Gong." In August 2009, Manfred Nowak, the United Nations Special Rapporteur on Torture, said, "The Chinese government has yet to come clean and be transparent... It remains to be seen how it could be possible that organ transplant surgeries in Chinese hospitals have risen massively since 1999, while there are never that many voluntary donors available."

In 2014, investigative journalist Ethan Gutmann published the result of his own investigation. Gutmann conducted extensive interviews with former detainees in Chinese labor camps and prisons, as well as former security officers and medical professionals with knowledge of China's transplant practices. He reported that organ harvesting from political prisoners likely began in Xinjiang province in the 1990s, and then spread nationwide. Gutmann estimates that some 64,000 Falun Gong prisoners may have been killed for their organs between the years 2000 and 2008.

In a 2016 report, David Kilgour found that he had underestimated. In the new report he found that the government's official estimates for the volume of organs harvested since the persecution of Falun Gong began to be 150,000 to 200,000. Media outlets have extrapolated from this study a death toll of 1,500,000. Ethan Gutmann estimated from this update that 60,000 to 110,000 organs are harvested in China annually observing that it is (paraphrasing): "difficult but plausible to harvest 3 organs from a single body" and also calls the harvest "a new form of genocide using the most respected members of society."

In June 2019, the China Tribunal—an independent tribunal set up by the International Coalition to End Transplant Abuse in China—concluded that detainees including imprisoned followers of the Falun Gong movement are still being killed for organ harvesting. The Tribunal, chaired by Sir Geoffrey Nice QC, said it was "certain that Falun Gong as a source—probably the principal source—of organs for forced organ harvesting".

Media campaign
The Chinese government's campaign against Falun Gong was driven by large-scale propaganda through television, newspapers, radio and internet. The propaganda campaign focused on allegations that Falun Gong jeopardized social stability, was deceiving and dangerous, was anti-science and threatened progress, and argued that Falun Gong's moral philosophy was incompatible with a Marxist social ethic.

China scholars Daniel Wright and Joseph Fewsmith stated that for several months after Falun Gong was outlawed, China Central Television's evening news contained little but anti-Falun Gong rhetoric; the government operation was "a study in all-out demonization", they wrote. Falun Gong was compared to "a rat crossing the street that everyone shouts out to squash" by Beijing Daily; other officials said it would be a "long-term, complex and serious" struggle to "eradicate" Falun Gong.

State propaganda initially used the appeal of scientific rationalism to argue that Falun Gong's worldview was in "complete opposition to science" and communism. For example, the People's Daily asserted on 27 July 1999, that the fight against Falun Gong "was a struggle between theism and atheism, superstition and science, idealism and materialism." Other editorials declared that Falun Gong's "idealism and theism" are "absolutely contradictory to the fundamental theories and principles of Marxism", and that the "'truth, kindness and forbearance' principle preached by [Falun Gong] has nothing in common with the socialist ethical and cultural progress we are striving to achieve." Suppressing Falun Gong was presented as a necessary step to maintaining the "vanguard role" of the Communist Party in Chinese society.

Despite Party efforts, initial charges leveled against Falun Gong failed to elicit widespread popular support for the persecution of the group. In the months following July 1999, the rhetoric in the state-run press escalated to include charges that Falun Gong was colluding with foreign, "anti-China" forces. In October 1999, three months after the persecution began, the People's Daily newspaper claimed Falun Gong as a xiejiao. A direct translation of that term is "heretical teaching", but during the anti-Falun Gong propaganda campaign was rendered as "evil cult" in English. In Mainland China, the term xiejiao has been used to target religious organizations that do not submit to Communist Party authority.Freedom House, "Report Analyzing Seven Secret Chinese Government Documents" , 11 February 2002.

Ian Johnson argued that applying the 'cult' label to Falun Gong effectively "cloaked the government's crackdown with the legitimacy of the West's anticult movement." He wrote that Falun Gong does not satisfy common definitions of a cult: "its members marry outside the group, have outside friends, hold normal jobs, do not live isolated from society, do not believe that the world's end is imminent and do not give significant amounts of money to the organisation... it does not advocate violence and is at heart an apolitical, inward-oriented discipline, one aimed at cleansing oneself spiritually and improving one's health." David Ownby similarly wrote that "the entire issue of the supposed cultic nature of Falun Gong was a red herring from the beginning, cleverly exploited by the Chinese state to blunt the appeal of Falun Gong". According to John Powers and Meg Y. M. Lee, because the Falun Gong was categorized in the popular perception as an "apolitical, qigong exercise club", it was not seen as a threat to the government. The most critical strategy in the Falun Gong suppression campaign, therefore, was to convince people to reclassify the Falun Gong into a number of "negatively charged religious labels", like "evil cult", "sect", or "superstition". The group's silent protests were reclassified as creating "social disturbances". In this process of relabelling, the government was attempting to tap into a "deep reservoir of negative feelings related to the historical role of quasi-religious cults as a destabilising force in Chinese political history."

A turning point in the propaganda campaign came on the eve of Chinese New Year on 23 January 2001, when five people attempted to set themselves ablaze on Tiananmen Square. The official Chinese press agency, Xinhua News Agency, and other state media asserted that the self-immolators were practitioners, though the Falun Dafa Information Center disputed this, on the grounds that the movement's teachings explicitly forbid suicide and killing, further alleging that the event was "a cruel (but clever) piece of stunt-work." The incident received international news coverage, and video footage of the burnings were broadcast later inside China by China Central Television (CCTV). The broadcasts showed images of a 12-year-old girl, Liu Siying, burning, and interviews with the other participants in which they stated a belief that self-immolation would lead them to paradise. But one of the CNN producers on the scene did not even see a child there. Falun Gong sources and other commentators pointed out that the main participants' account of the incident and other aspects of the participants' behavior were inconsistent with Falun Gong's teachings. Media Channel and the International Education Development (IED) agree that the supposed self-immolation incident was staged by CCP to "prove" that Falun Gong brainwashes its followers to commit suicide and has therefore to be banned as a threat to the nation. IED's statement at the 53rd UN session describes China's violent assault on Falun Gong practitioners as state terrorism and that the self-immolation "was staged by the government." Washington Post journalist Phillip Pan wrote that the two self-immolators who died were not actually Falun Gong practitioners. On March 21, 2001, Liu Siying suddenly died after appearing very lively and being deemed ready to leave the hospital to go home. Time reported that prior to the self-immolation incident, many Chinese had felt that Falun Gong posed no real threat, and that the state's crackdown had gone too far. After the event, however, the mainland Chinese media campaign against Falun Gong gained significant traction. As public sympathy for Falun Gong declined, the government began sanctioning "systematic use of violence" against the group.

In February, 2001, the month following the Tiananmen Square self-immolation incident, Jiang Zemin convened a rare Central Work Conference to stress the importance of continuity in the anti-Falun Gong campaign and unite senior party officials behind the effort. Under Jiang's leadership, the crackdown on Falun Gong became part of the Chinese political ethos of "upholding stability"—much the same rhetoric employed by the party during 1989 Tiananmen Square protests and massacre. Jiang's message was echoed at the 2001 National People's Congress, where the Falun Gong's eradication was tied to China's economic progress. Though less prominent on the national agenda, the persecution of Falun Gong has carried on after Jiang was retired; successive, high-level "strike hard" campaigns against Falun Gong were initiated in both 2008 and 2009. In 2010, a three-year campaign was launched to renew attempts at the coercive "transformation" of Falun Gong practitioners.

In the education system
Anti-Falun Gong propaganda efforts have also permeated the Chinese education system. Following Jiang Zemin's 1999 ban of Falun Gong, then-Minister of Education Chen Zhili launched an active campaign to promote the Party's line on Falun Gong within all levels of academic institutions, including graduate schools, universities and colleges, middle schools, primary schools, and kindergartens. Her efforts included a "Cultural Revolution-like pledge" in Chinese schools that required faculty members, staff, and students to publicly denounce Falun Gong. Teachers who did not comply with Chen's program were dismissed or detained; uncooperative students were refused academic advancement, expelled from school, or sent to "transformation" camps to alter their thinking. Chen also worked to spread the anti-Falun Gong academic propaganda movement overseas, using domestic educational funding to donate aid to foreign institutions, encouraging them to oppose Falun Gong.

Falun Gong's response to the persecution

Falun Gong's response to the persecution in China began in July 1999 with appeals to local, provincial, and central petitioning offices in Beijing. It soon progressed to larger demonstrations, with hundreds of Falun Gong practitioners traveling daily to Tiananmen Square to perform Falun Gong exercises or raise banners in defense of the practice. These demonstrations were invariably broken up by security forces, and the practitioners involved were arrested—sometimes violently—and detained. By 25 April 2000, a total of more than 30,000 practitioners had been arrested on the square; seven hundred Falun Gong followers were arrested during a demonstration in the square on 1 January 2001. Public protests continued well into 2001. Writing for the Wall Street Journal, Ian Johnson wrote that "Falun Gong faithful have mustered what is arguably the most sustained challenge to authority in 50 years of Communist rule."

By late 2001, demonstrations in Tiananmen Square had become less frequent, and the practice was driven deeper underground. As public protest fell out of favor, practitioners established underground "material sites", which would produce literature and DVDs to counter the portrayal of Falun Gong in the official media. Practitioners then distribute these materials, often door-to-door. Falun Gong sources estimated in 2009 that over 200,000 such sites exist across China today. The production, possession, or distribution of these materials is frequently grounds for security agents to incarcerate or sentence Falun Gong practitioners.

In 2002, Falun Gong activists in China tapped into television broadcasts, replacing regular state-run programming with their own content. One of the more notable instances occurred in March 2002, when Falun Gong practitioners in Changchun intercepted eight cable television networks in Jilin Province, and for nearly an hour, televised a program titled "Self-Immolation or a Staged Act?". All six of the Falun Gong practitioners involved were captured over the next few months. Two were killed immediately, while the other four were all dead by 2010 as a result of injuries sustained while imprisoned.

Outside China, Falun Gong practitioners established international media organizations to gain wider exposure for their cause and challenge narratives of the Chinese state-run media. These include The Epoch Times newspaper, New Tang Dynasty Television, and Sound of Hope radio station. According to Zhao, through The Epoch Times it can be discerned how Falun Gong is building a "de facto media alliance" with China's democracy movements in exile, as demonstrated by its frequent printing of articles by prominent overseas Chinese critics of the PRC government. In 2004, The Epoch Times published a collection of nine editorials that presented a critical history of Communist Party rule. This catalyzed the Tuidang movement, which encourages Chinese citizens to renounce their affiliations to the Chinese Communist Party, including ex post facto renunciations of the Communist Youth League and Young Pioneers. The Epoch Times claims that tens of millions have renounced the Communist Party as part of the movement, though these numbers have not been independently verified.

In 2006, Falun Gong practitioners in the United States formed Shen Yun Performing Arts, a dance and music company that tours internationally.

Falun Gong software developers in the United States are also responsible for the creation of several popular censorship-circumvention tools employed by internet users in China.

Falun Gong practitioners outside China have filed dozens of lawsuits against Jiang Zemin, Luo Gan, Bo Xilai, and other Chinese officials alleging genocide and crimes against humanity. According to International Advocates for Justice, Falun Gong has filed the largest number of human rights lawsuits in the 21st century and the charges are among the most severe international crimes defined by international criminal laws. As of 2006, 54 civil and criminal lawsuits were under way in 33 countries. In many instances, courts have refused to adjudicate the cases on the grounds of sovereign immunity. In late 2009, however, separate courts in Spain and Argentina indicted Jiang Zemin and Luo Gan on charges of "crimes of humanity" and genocide, and asked for their arrest—the ruling is acknowledged to be largely symbolic and unlikely to be carried out. The court in Spain also indicted Bo Xilai, Jia Qinglin and Wu Guanzheng.

Falun Gong practitioners and their supporters also filed a lawsuit in May 2011 against the technology company Cisco Systems, alleging that the company helped design and implement a surveillance system for the Chinese government to suppress Falun Gong. Cisco denied customizing their technology for this purpose.

Falun Gong outside China

Li Hongzhi began teaching Falun Gong internationally in March 1995. His first stop was in Paris where, at the invitation of the Chinese ambassador, he held a lecture seminar at the PRC embassy. This was followed by lectures in Sweden in May 1995. Between 1995 and 1999, Li gave lectures in the United States, Canada, Australia, New Zealand, Germany, Switzerland, and Singapore.

Falun Gong's growth outside China largely corresponded to the migration of students from Mainland China to the West in the early- to mid-1990s. Falun Gong associations and clubs began appearing in Europe, North America and Australia, with activities centered mainly on university campuses.

Translations of Falun Gong teachings began appearing in the late 1990s. As the practice began proliferating outside China, Li Hongzhi was beginning to receive recognition in the United States and elsewhere in the western world. In May 1999, Li was welcomed to Toronto with greetings from the city's mayor and the provincial lieutenant governor, and in the two months that followed also received recognition from the cities of Chicago and San Jose.

Although the practice was beginning to attract an overseas constituency in the 1990s, it remained relatively unknown outside China until the Spring of 1999, when tensions between Falun Gong and Communist Party authorities became a subject of international media coverage. With the increased attention, the practice gained a greater following outside China. Following the launch of the Communist Party's suppression campaign against Falun Gong, the overseas presence became vital to the practice's resistance in China and its continued survival. Falun Gong practitioners overseas have responded to the persecution in China through regular demonstrations, parades, and through the creation of media outlets, performing arts companies, and censorship-circumvention software mainly intended to reach Mainland Chinese audiences.

International reception
Since 1999, numerous Western governments and human rights organizations have expressed condemnation of the Chinese government's suppression of Falun Gong. Since 1999, members of the United States Congress have made public pronouncements and introduced several resolutions in support of Falun Gong. In 2010, U.S. House of Representatives Resolution 605 called for "an immediate end to the campaign to persecute, intimidate, imprison, and torture Falun Gong practitioners", condemned the Chinese authorities' efforts to distribute "false propaganda" about the practice worldwide, and expressed sympathy to persecuted Falun Gong practitioners and their families.

Adam Frank writes that in reporting on the Falun Gong, the Western tradition of casting the Chinese as "exotic" took dominance, and that while the facts were generally correct in Western media coverage, "the normalcy that millions of Chinese practitioners associated with the practice had all but disappeared." David Ownby wrote that alongside these tactics, the "cult" label applied to Falun Gong by the Chinese authorities never entirely went away in the minds of some Westerners, and the stigma still plays a role in wary public perceptions of Falun Gong.

To counter the support of Falun Gong in the West, the Chinese government expanded their efforts against the group internationally. This included visits to newspaper officers by diplomats to "extol the virtues of Communist China and the evils of Falun Gong", linking support for Falun Gong with "jeopardizing trade relations", and sending letters to local politicians telling them to withdraw support for the practice. According to Perry Link, pressure on Western institutions also takes more subtle forms, including academic self-censorship, whereby research on Falun Gong could result in a denial of visa for fieldwork in China; or exclusion and discrimination from business and community groups who have connections with China and fear angering the Communist Party.

Although the persecution of Falun Gong has drawn considerable condemnation outside China, some observers assert that Falun Gong has failed to attract the level of sympathy and sustained attention afforded to other Chinese dissident groups. Katrina Lantos Swett, vice chair of the United States Commission on International Religious Freedom, has said most Americans are aware of the suppression of "Tibetan Buddhists and unregistered Christian groups or pro-democracy and free speech advocates such as Liu Xiaobo and Ai Weiwei", and yet "know little to nothing about China's assault on the Falun Gong".

Ethan Gutmann, a journalist reporting on China since the early 1990s, has attempted to explain this apparent dearth of public sympathy for Falun Gong as stemming, in part, from the group's shortcomings in public relations. Unlike the democracy activists or Tibetans, who have found a comfortable place in Western perceptions, "Falun Gong marched to a distinctly Chinese drum", Gutmann writes. Moreover, practitioners' attempts at getting their message across carried some of the uncouthness of Communist party culture, including a perception that practitioners tended to exaggerate, create "torture tableaux straight out of a Cultural Revolution opera", or "spout slogans rather than facts". This is coupled with a general doubtfulness in the West of persecuted refugees. Gutmann also says that media organizations and human rights groups also self-censor on the topic, given the PRC governments vehement attitude toward the practice, and the potential repercussions that may follow for making overt representations on Falun Gong's behalf.

Richard Madsen writes that Falun Gong lacks robust backing from the American constituencies that usually support religious freedom. For instance, Falun Gong's conservative moral beliefs have alienated some liberal constituencies in the West (e.g. its teachings against promiscuity and homosexual behavior). Christian conservatives, by contrast, do not accord the practice the same space as persecuted Chinese Christians. Madsen charges that the American political center does not want to push the human rights issue so hard that it would disrupt commercial and political relations with China. Thus, Falun Gong practitioners have largely had to rely on their own resources in responding to suppression.

In August 2007, the newly reestablished Rabbinic Sanhedrin deliberated persecution of the movement by the Chinese government at the request of Falun Gong.

The Epoch Times and Shen Yun

The performance arts group Shen Yun and the media organization The Epoch Times are the major outreach organizations of Falun Gong. Both promote the spiritual and political teachings of Falun Gong. They and a variety of other organizations such as New Tang Dynasty Television (NTD) operate as extensions of Falun Gong. These extensions promote the new religious movement and its teachings. In the case of The Epoch Times, they also promote conspiracy theories such as QAnon and anti-vaccine misinformation and far-right politics in both Europe and the United States. Around the time of the 2016 United States presidential election, The Epoch Times began running articles supportive of Donald Trump and critical of his opponents. Falun Gong extensions have also been active in promoting the European Radical right.

The exact financial and structural connections between Falun Gong, Shen Yun and The Epoch Times remains unclear. According to NBC News:
The Epoch Media Group, along with Shen Yun, a dance troupe known for its ubiquitous advertising and unsettling performances, make up the outreach effort of Falun Gong, a relatively new spiritual practice that combines ancient Chinese meditative exercises, mysticism and often ultraconservative cultural worldviews. Falun Gong's founder has referred to Epoch Media Group as "our media", and the group's practice heavily informs The Epoch Times coverage, according to former employees who spoke with NBC News.

The Epoch Times, digital production company NTD and the heavily advertised dance troupe Shen Yun make up the nonprofit network that Li calls "our media." Financial documents paint a complicated picture of more than a dozen technically separate organizations that appear to share missions, money and executives. Though the source of their revenue is unclear, the most recent financial records from each organization paint a picture of an overall business thriving in the Trump era.

See also

 Freedom of religion in China
 Human rights in China
 List of new religious movements

References

Bibliography

 
 
 
  -  Link at Google Books

External links

 

Falun Gong
Meditation
New religious movements
Political abuses of psychiatry
Qigong
Homophobia
Creationism
Pseudoscience